Clement Endresen (born 8 November 1949) is a Norwegian judge.

He was born in Stavanger as the son of politician and judge Egil Endresen. He graduated as cand.jur. from the University of Oslo in 1974, and then worked as lecturer there from 1975 to 1977. He then worked as an attorney in Sandnes District Court from 1977, in the Office of the Attorney General of Norway from 1979 and in a law firm from 1980 to 2006. He was a Supreme Court Justice from 2006 to 2019.

References

1949 births
Living people
People from Stavanger
University of Oslo alumni
Academic staff of the University of Oslo
Supreme Court of Norway justices
20th-century Norwegian lawyers
21st-century Norwegian judges